Hueco (possibly from Aymara for a corner in a house, a mountain cove) is a mountain in the Vilcanota mountain range Andes of Peru, about  high. It is located in the Cusco Region, Canchis Province, San Pablo District, and in the Puno Region, Melgar Province, Nuñoa District. Hueco is situated southwest of Pomanota, Jatuncucho, Cochacucho and Jatun Sallica, and northeast of Quellhuacota.

References

Mountains of Peru
Mountains of Cusco Region
Mountains of Puno Region